Clark City is an unincorporated community in Clark County, in the U.S. state of Missouri.

History
Clark City was platted in 1868. A post office called Clark City was established in 1870, and remained in operation until 1903.

References

Unincorporated communities in Clark County, Missouri
Unincorporated communities in Missouri